The Oued Meboudja is a wadi in Algeria.

Location

The wadi is a left tributary of the Seybouse River, which it joins near El Hadjar to the south of the industrial center of Annaba.

Human impact

In 1877 the Société Mokta El Hadid mining company gained permission to drain the Lake of Fetzara in exchange for free transfer of the reclaimed land.
A channel led from the center of the lake, crossed the  western flank and led to the Oued Meboudja.

In May 2007 it was reported that farmers who used the waters of the wadi to irrigate their lands were greatly concerned about pollution.
A study published in 2013 found that the El Hadjar iron and steel works was discharging metallic pollution into the wadi, with unacceptably high levels of copper and varying concentrations of iron, chromium and nickel.

Notes

Sources

Rivers of Algeria